Desperadoes of the West (1950) is a 12-chapter Republic film serial.

Cast
Richard Powers as Ward Gordon
Judy Clark as Sally Arnold
Roy Barcroft as Hacker, a henchman
I. Stanford Jolley as J. B. "Dude" Dawson
Lee Phelps as Rusty Steele
Lee Roberts as Larson, a henchman
Cliff Clark as Colonel Arnold
Guy Teague as Jack

Production
Desperadoes of the West was budgeted at $153,081 although the final negative cost was $150,246 (a $2,835, or 1.9%, under spend).  It was the cheapest Republic serial of 1950.

It was filmed between May 31 and June 22, 1950 under the working titles Bandit King of Oklahoma and Desperado Kings of the West.  The serial's studio production number was 1708.

Stunts
Tom Steele as Ward Gordon (doubling Richard Powers)
Dale Van Sickel as Hacker/Ward Gordon (doubling Roy Barcroft & Richard Powers)
John Daheim

Special effects
Special effects by the Lydecker brothers.

Release

Theatrical
Desperadoes of the West's official release date is 2 August 1950, although this is actually the date the sixth chapter was made available to film exchanges.

Chapter titles
 Tower of Jeopardy (20min)
 Perilous Barrier (13min 20s)
 Flaming Cargo (13min 20s)
 Trail of Terror (13min 20s)
 Plunder Cave (13min 20s)
 Six-Gun Hijacker (13min 20s)
 The Powder Keg (13min 20s)
 Desperate Venture (13min 20s)
 Stagecoach to Eternity (13min 20s)
 Hidden Desperado (13min 20s) - a re-cap chapter
 Open Warfare (13min 20s)
 Desperate Gamble (13min 20s)
Source:

See also
 List of film serials by year
 List of film serials by studio

References

External links

1950 films
1950 Western (genre) films
American black-and-white films
1950s English-language films
Republic Pictures film serials
American Western (genre) films
Films directed by Fred C. Brannon
1950s American films